Vice Admiral Sir Christopher Reginald Summers Gardner,  (born 10 October 1962) is a senior Royal Navy officer.

Naval career
Gardner joined the Royal Navy as a logistics officer in 1984.

Gardner became Head of Capability Improvement at the Ministry of Defence in 2010, Assistant Chief of Staff (Ships) in 2014 and Assistant Chief of the Naval Staff (Ships) in 2015. He was promoted to the rank of vice admiral and become Chief of Materiel (Ships) at Defence Equipment and Support in April 2019. Gardner's appointment has re-titled as 'Director General Ships'.

Already Commander of the Order of the British Empire (CBE), Gardner was appointed Knight Commander of the Order of the British Empire (KBE) in the 2022 New Year Honours.

Family
In 1993, Gardner married Teresa Heather Edgecombe; they have one son and one daughter.

References

1962 births
Knights Commander of the Order of the British Empire
Living people
Royal Navy vice admirals
Royal Navy personnel of the Iraq War